The Anglican Diocese of Abakaliki is one of 12 within the Anglican Province of Enugu, itself one of 14 provinces within the Church of Nigeria. The current bishop is Monday Nkwoagu.

Notes

Dioceses of the Province of Enugu
 
Church of Nigeria dioceses